The Boxing at the 1983 Southeast Asian Games was held between 30 May to 3 June at Singapore University Gymnasium.

Medal summary

Medal table

References
 https://eresources.nlb.gov.sg/newspapers/Digitised/Article/straitstimes19830604-1.2.113
 https://eresources.nlb.gov.sg/newspapers/Digitised/Article/straitstimes19830606-1.2.102

1983 Southeast Asian Games events
Boxing at the Southeast Asian Games